The Omni Broadcasting Network was a small over-the-air broadcast television network in the United States (not to be confused with the Canadian broadcast system Omni Television). The company's motto was "Less Edge and More Entertaining". Omni's flagship station was low-power station KSSY-LP. The network's reach was reported as 50 million households, according to a quote in Variety.

History
The Omni Broadcasting Network was incorporated in 2001. Its parent company, OBN Holdings, produced films as well as television. OBN's target demographic was adults age 25 and older during prime time, and ages 8 to 13 on weekend mornings.

Broadcast operations began in September 2003. In December 2003, Omni announced affiliation agreements with 119 stations and cable systems, as well as the All Sports Television Network.

According to an Omni executive, the network struggled to get the funding necessary for new projects. OBN Holdings' stock was delisted in 2013.

Programming
Omni broadcast 60 hours of programming per week, 21 hours during prime time. The network primarily ran classic films, usually during late-night hours or on the weekends. Omni also offered a few original programs. One was "Thirteen O'Clock Theater", an umbrella title for old science fiction and horror films in public domain, shown at 1 AM. The network also showed older children's programming such as Birdz, (to meet FCC requirements for educational and informative programming requirements), as well as The MovieTime Showcase, The Flutemaster, The Mini-Movie Hour, and Wizards Tales.

The network also broadcast the 50th Anniversary concert of the Four Tops. This was the network's first original production, taped July 28, 2004, Titled From the Heart: The Four Tops 50th Anniversary and Celebration, the special aired in 2005, and starred musicians Aretha Franklin, Paul Rodgers, Dennis Edwards (of The Temptations), and Mary Wilson (of The Supremes), in addition to the Four Tops themselves. The special won the network a Telly Award.

Other original programs included The Vegas Variety Hour and The Adventures of Unit 28.

Former affiliates
The following were signed or pending OBN affiliates in December 2003:

Additionally, the following major network stations aired OBN's From the Heart: The Four Tops 50th Anniversary and Celebration special:

KCRG-TV, Cedar Rapids, IA, channel 9
KTVF, Fairbanks, AK, channel 11
WCTI-TV, Greenville, NC, channel 12
WHP-TV, Harrisburg, PA, channel 21
WIVT, Binghamton, NY, channel 34
WKOW-TV, Madison, WI, channel 27

References

External links
 Omni Website (Website archived)
 Information on Omni Holdings

Television networks in the United States
Defunct television networks in the United States
Television channels and stations established in 2003
Television channels and stations disestablished in 2013